Ukrainian Catholic Eparchy of Vilnius (or Vilnius of the Ukrainians) and its successor Žyrovyci of the Ukrainians were the only eparchy (Eastern Catholic diocese) in Lithuania of the Ukrainian Greek Catholic Church (sui iuris, Byzantine Rite in Ukrainian language), but short-lived (1809-1828-1833).

History 
The bishopric was established in 1809 as Ukrainian Catholic Eparchy of Vilnius, on (then Russian-imperial) territory, not previously served by the particular church.

It was suppressed in 1828, but immediately replaced by the Ukrainian Catholic Eparchy of Žyrovyci, to which its last incumbent was appointed, only to be suppressed again in 1833, without successor.

Episcopal ordinaries
(all Ukrainian Rite)

Eparchs (Bishops) of Vilnius of the Ukrainians 
 Hryhorij Koxanovyc (Grzegorz Kochanowicz) (1809 – 1810), previously Auxiliary Bishop of Lutsk–Ostroh of the Ukrainians (Ukraine) (1798.04.20 – 1807) succeeding as Eparch (Bishop) of Lutsk–Ostroh of the Ukrainians (1807 – 1814); later Metropolitan Archeparch (Archbishop) of Kyiv–Halyč of the Ukrainians (Ukraine) (1810 – death 1814)
 Auxiliary Bishop: Bishop-elect Adrijan Holovnja (Holownia), Basilian Order of Saint Josaphat (O.S.B.M.) (1809.09.22 – 1811)
 Apostolic Administrator Josafat Bułhak, (O.S.B.M.) (1814 – 1818 see below), while Eparch of Volodymyr–Brėst of the Ukrainians (Ukraine) (1798.10.12 – 1818.09.22); previously Eparch of Pinsk–Turaŭ of the Ruthenians (Belarus) (1787.04.24 – 1798.10.12) and Apostolic Administrator of Kyiv–Halyč of the Ukrainians (Ukraine) (1817.01.27 – 1818.09.22)
 Josafat Bułhak, O.S.B.M. (see above 1818 – 1828, see suppressed: see below), also Metropolitan Archbishop of Kyiv–Halyč of the Ukrainians (Ukraine) (1818.09.22 – 1838.03.09), first Eparch of successor see Žyrovyci of the Ukrainians (Lithuania) (1828 – 1833.04.14)

Eparchs (Bishops) of Žyrovyci of the Ukrainians 
 Josafat Bułhak, O.S.B.M. (see above 1828 – 1833.04.14); later Archeparch of Polatsk–Vitebsk of the Ruthenians (Belarus) (1833.04.14 – death 1838.03.09)
 Józef Siemaszko (1833.04.02 – 1839.02.12 but see suppressed 1833); previously Latin Auxiliary Bishop of Roman Catholic Diocese of Płock (Poland) (1829.04.21 – 1833.04.02); died 1869

See also 
 the Latin Roman Catholic Archdiocese of Vilnius (initially a bishopric)

Sources and external links 
 GCatholic - Vilnius
 GCatholic - Žyrovyci

Vilnius
History of the Ukrainian Greek Catholic Church
Vilnius
Christianity in Vilnius
History of Eastern Catholicism in Lithuania
1809 establishments in the Russian Empire
Religious organizations established in 1809
19th-century establishments in Lithuania
Religious organizations disestablished in 1833
1830s disestablishments in Poland
19th-century disestablishments in the Russian Empire
Lithuania–Ukraine relations